Anze County is a county in the south of Shanxi Province, China, under the administration of the prefecture-level city of Linfen. The county spans an area of 1,967 square kilometers, and has a population of 82,012 as of 2010.

History 
The county was first established in 528 CE as part of the Northern Wei Dynasty. In 606 CE, the county was renamed to Yueyang County.

In 1971, Gu County split off from Anze County.

Geography 
The county's elevation ranges from 732 meters to 1,592 meters in height, with the county's highest point being Mount Antai. 45.44% of Anze County's land area is forested.

Climate 
The county experiences an average of 2246.1 hours of sunshine annually, 539.1 millimeters of precipitation annually, 172 frost-free days annually, and an average temperature of 9.4 °C.

Administrative divisions 
The county is divided into 4 towns and 3 townships.

Economy 
Anze County has a number of natural resources, particularly coal. 1,944 square kilometers of land within the county has been identified as having significant coal reserves, totaling an estimated 24 billion tons of coal. Iron ore deposits within the county total an area of approximately 1.4 square kilometers, containing an estimated 1 million tons of ore. Significant reserves of calcite, porcelain clay, and methane have also been discovered within Anze County.

Transport 
National Highway 309 and Shanxi Provincial Road 326 both run through the county.

References

 
County-level divisions of Shanxi